The LD&ECR class A (LNER Class N6) was a class of 0-6-2T steam locomotives of the Lancashire, Derbyshire and East Coast Railway.  An initial batch of eight was ordered and built in 1895. An order for 15 more was placed in 1899 but five of these were not delivered because the LD&ECR was unable to pay for them. The undelivered locomotives were re-sold by Kitson & Co. to the Hull and Barnsley Railway and became H&BR Class F1 (LNER Class N11). There are some detail differences between the LD&ECR class A and the H&BR Class F1 but these were the result of later modifications.

References

 

A
0-6-2T locomotives
Kitson locomotives
Railway locomotives introduced in 1895
Scrapped locomotives
Standard gauge steam locomotives of Great Britain

Freight locomotives